Robert Lomax "Butch" Davis (May 4, 1916 – November 28, 1988) was an American baseball left fielder in the Negro leagues. He played for the Atlanta Black Crackers in 1944 and the Baltimore Elite Giants in 1947 and 1949. He also played in Minor League Baseball until 1955.

References

External links
 and Baseball-Reference Black Baseball / Minor league stats and Seamheads

Atlanta Black Crackers players
Baltimore Elite Giants players
Winnipeg Buffaloes players
Albany Senators players
Toledo Mud Hens players
Scranton Miners players
Minot Mallards players
1916 births
1988 deaths
20th-century African-American sportspeople
Baseball outfielders